Karanasa moorei is a butterfly of the family Nymphalidae. It is found in north-western India and Afghanistan.

Subspecies
Karanasa moorei moorei (north-western India: Chitral)
Karanasa moorei dubia Avinoff & Sweadner, 1951 (north-western India: Gilgit, Chitral)
Karanasa moorei gilgitica Tytler, 1926 (north-western India: Gilgit)
Karanasa moorei haarlovi Avinoff & Sweadner, 1951 (Afghanistan: western Hindu Kush)

References

Butterflies described in 1912
Satyrini